R.E.V.O. is an EP by Canadian indie band Walk off the Earth which was released on 30 October 2012 through Columbia Records.

Track list

Personnel
Walk off the Earth
Gianni Luminati
Ryan Marshall
Mike Taylor
Joel Cassady
Sarah Blackwood

Production
Production, engineering, mixing and mastering by Gianni Luminati and Tawgs Salter

Reggae EPs
2012 debut EPs
Columbia Records EPs
EPs by Canadian artists
Walk Off the Earth albums